Nafiseh Fayyazbakhsh is an Iranian conservative politician who served as a member of the Parliament of Iran for three terms from 1992 to 2000, and 2004 to 2008 representing Tehran, Rey, Shemiranat and Eslamshahr.

References

1964 births
Living people
Members of the 4th Islamic Consultative Assembly
Members of the 5th Islamic Consultative Assembly
Members of the 7th Islamic Consultative Assembly
Deputies of Tehran, Rey, Shemiranat and Eslamshahr
Zeynab Society politicians
Society of Devotees of the Islamic Revolution politicians
Alliance of Builders of Islamic Iran politicians
Members of the Women's fraction of Islamic Consultative Assembly
21st-century Iranian women politicians
21st-century Iranian politicians